Tonglu railway station is a railway station in Tonglu County, Hangzhou, Zhejiang, China. It opened on 25 December 2018 along with the Hangzhou–Huangshan intercity railway. It is also the southern terminus of the Shangqiu–Hangzhou high-speed railway (Huzhou–Hangzhou section).

References 

Railway stations in Zhejiang
Railway stations in China opened in 2018